The West Coast garter snake (Thamnophis validus) is a species of snake in the family Colubridae. The species is endemic to Mexico. Four subspecies are recognized.

Geographic range
T. validus is found in the Mexican states of Baja California Sur, Chihuahua, Guerrero, Jalisco, and Sonora.

Reproduction
T. validus is viviparous.

Subspecies
There are four subspecies of T. validus which are recognized as being valid, including the nominate subspecies.
Mexican Pacific Lowlands garter snake (T. v. celaeno) 
T. v. isabelleae 
T. v. thamnophisoides 
T. v. validus 

Nota bene: A trinomial authority in parentheses indicates that the subspecies was originally described in a genus other than Thamnophis.

Etymology
The subspecific name isabelleae is in honor of the American wildlife artist Isabelle Hunt Conant, the wife of the American herpetologist Roger Conant.

References

Further reading
Boulenger GA (1893). Catalogue of the Snakes in the British Museum (Natural History). Volume I., Containing the Families ... Colubridæ Aglyphæ, part. London: Trustees of the British Museum (Natural History). (Taylor and Francis, printers). xiii + 448 pp. + Plates I-XXVIII. (Tropidonotus validus, pp. 237–238).
Conant R (1953). "Three New Water Snakes of the Genus [Natrix] from Mexico". Natural History Miscellanea (126): 1–9. (Natrix valida isabelleae, new subspecies, pp. 7–9).
Conant R (1961). "A New Water Snake from Mexico, with Notes on Anal Plates and Apical Pits in Natrix and Thamnophis ". American Museum Novitates (2060): 1-22. (Natrix valida thamnophisoides, new subspecies, pp. 2–12, Figure 1).
Cope ED (1861). "Notes and descriptions of new and little known species of American Reptiles". Proc. Acad. Nat. Sci. Philadelphia 12: 339–345. (Tropidonotus celaeno, new species, p. 341).
Kennicott R (1860). "Descriptions of New Species of North American Serpents in the Museum of the Smithsonian Institution, Washington". Proc. Acad. Nat. Sci. Philadelphia 12: 328–338. (Regina valida, new species, pp. 334–335).

Thamnophis
Reptiles described in 1860
Taxa named by Robert Kennicott
Reptiles of Mexico
Taxobox binomials not recognized by IUCN